The following is a list of soccer players who have scored at least 100 domestic league goals in Australian league soccer. This includes the appearances and goals of players in the A-League Men and National Soccer League.

List of players

Key
 Players still active in the Australian professional leagues are listed in Bold
 † Football Australia Hall of Fame Inductee.

See also

 List of soccer players in Australia by number of league appearances

Notes

References
General
 

Specific

Australian soccer club statistics
players by number of league goals
Lists of association football players